Direct Action Day (16 August 1946) was the day the Muslim League decided to take "direct action" for a separate Muslim homeland after the British exit from India. Also known as the 1946 Calcutta Killings, it was a day of nationwide communal riots. It led to large-scale violence between Muslims and Hindus in the city of Calcutta (now known as Kolkata) in the Bengal province of British India. The day also marked the start of what is known as The Week of the Long Knives. While there is a certain degree of consensus on the magnitude of the killings (although no precise casualty figures are available), including their short-term consequences, controversy remains regarding the exact sequence of events, the various actors' responsibility and the long-term political consequences.

Controversy still rages about the respective responsibilities of the two main communities, the Hindus and the Muslims, in addition to individual leaders' roles in the carnage. The dominant British view tends to blame both communities equally and to single out the calculations of the leaders and the savagery of the followers for whom were criminal elements. In the Congress’ version of the events, the blame tends to be squarely laid on the Muslim League and in particular on the Chief Minister of Bengal, Suhrawardy. The view from the Muslim League, which is partly upheld in Bangladesh, the successor state to East Pakistan, is that Congress and the Hindus in fact used the opportunity offered by Direct Action Day to teach the Muslims in Calcutta a lesson and to kill them in great numbers. Thus, the riots opened the way to a partition of Bengal between a Hindu-dominated Western Bengal including Calcutta and a Muslim-dominated Eastern Bengal (now Bangladesh).

The All-India Muslim League and the Indian National Congress were the two largest political parties in the Constituent Assembly of India in the 1940s. The Muslim League had demanded since its 1940 Lahore Resolution for the Muslim-majority areas of India in the northwest and the east to be constituted as 'independent states'. The 1946 Cabinet Mission to India for planning of the transfer of power from the British Raj to the Indian leadership proposed a three-tier structure: a centre, groups of provinces and provinces. The "groups of provinces" were meant to accommodate the Muslim League's demand. Both the Muslim League and the Congress in principle accepted the Cabinet Mission's plan. However, the Muslim League suspected the Congress's acceptance to be insincere.

Consequently, in July 1946, the Muslim League withdrew its agreement to the plan and announced a general strike (hartal) on 16 August, terming it Direct Action Day, to assert its demand for a separate homeland for Muslims in certain northwestern and eastern provinces in colonial India. Calling for Direct Action Day, Muhammad Ali Jinnah, the leader of the All India Muslim League, said that he wanted 'either a divided India or a destroyed India'.

Against a backdrop of communal tension, the protest triggered massive riots in Calcutta. More than 4,000 people died and 100,000 residents were left homeless in Calcutta within 72 hours. The violence sparked off further religious riots in the surrounding regions of Noakhali, Bihar, United Provinces (modern Uttar Pradesh), Punjab (including massacres in Rawalpindi) and the North Western Frontier Province. The events sowed the seeds for the eventual Partition of India.

Background

In 1946, the Indian independence movement against the British Raj had reached a pivotal stage. British Prime Minister Clement Attlee sent a three-member Cabinet Mission to India aimed at discussing and finalizing plans for the transfer of power from the British Raj to the Indian leadership. After holding talks with the representatives of the Indian National Congress and the All India Muslim League—the two largest political parties in the Constituent Assembly of India—on 16 May 1946, the Mission proposed a plan of composition of the new Dominion of India and its government.
The Muslim League demand for 'autonomous and sovereign' states in the northwest and the east was accommodated by creating a new tier of 'groups of provinces' between the provincial layer and the central government. The central government was expected to handle the subjects of defence, external affairs and communications. All other powers would be relegated to the 'groups'.

Muhammad Ali Jinnah, the one time Congressman and now the leader of the Muslim League, had accepted the Cabinet Mission Plan of 16 June, as had the central presidium of the Congress. On 10 July, however, Jawaharlal Nehru, the Congress President, held a press conference in Bombay declaring that although the Congress had agreed to participate in the Constituent Assembly, it reserved the right to modify the Cabinet Mission Plan as it saw fit. Fearing Hindu domination in the central government, the Muslim League politicians pressed Jinnah to revert to "his earlier unbending stance". Jinnah rejected the British Cabinet Mission plan for transfer of power to an interim government which would combine both the Muslim League and the Indian National Congress, and decided to boycott the Constituent Assembly. In July 1946, Jinnah held a press conference at his home in Bombay. He proclaimed that the Muslim league was "preparing to launch a struggle" and that they "have chalked out a plan". He said that if the Muslims were not granted a separate Pakistan then they would launch "direct action". When asked to be specific, Jinnah retorted: "Go to the Congress and ask them their plans. When they take you into their confidence I will take you into mine. Why do you expect me alone to sit with folded hands? I also am going to make trouble."

The next day, Jinnah announced 16 August 1946 would be "Direct Action Day" and warned Congress, "We do not want war. If you want war we accept your offer unhesitatingly. We will either have a divided India or a destroyed India."

In his book The Great Divide, H V Hodson recounted, "The Working Committee followed up by calling on Muslims throughout India to observe 16th August as 'Direct Action Day'. On that day, meetings would be held all over the country to explain the League's resolution. These meetings and processions passed off–as was manifestly the central League leaders' intention–without more than commonplace and limited disturbances, with one vast and tragic exception ... What happened was more than anyone could have foreseen."

In Muslim Societies: Historical and Comparative Aspects, edited by Sato Tsugitaka, Nakazato Nariaki writes:

Prelude
Since the 11–14 February 1946 riots in Calcutta, communal tension had been high. Hindu and Muslim newspapers whipped up public sentiment with inflammatory and highly partisan reporting that heightened antagonism between the two communities.

Following Jinnah's declaration of 16 August as the Direct Action Day, acting on the advice of R.L. Walker, the then Chief Secretary of Bengal, the Muslim League Chief Minister of Bengal, Huseyn Shaheed Suhrawardy, requested Governor of Bengal Sir Frederick Burrows to declare a public holiday on that day. Governor Burrows agreed. Walker made this proposal with the hope that the risk of conflicts, especially those related to picketing, would be minimized if government offices, commercial houses and shops remained closed throughout Calcutta on 16 August. The Bengal Congress protested against the declaration of a public holiday, arguing that a holiday would enable 'the idle folks' to successfully enforce hartals in areas where the Muslim League leadership was uncertain. Congress accused the League government of "having indulged in 'communal politics' for a narrow goal". Congress leaders thought that if a public holiday was observed, its own supporters would have no choice but to close down their offices and shops, and thus be compelled against their will to lend a hand in the Muslim League's hartal. On 14 August, Kiron Shankar Roy, a leader of the Congress Party in the Bengal Legislative Assembly, called on Hindu shopkeepers to not observe the public holiday, and keep their businesses open in defiance of the hartal. In essence, there was an element of pride involved in that the monopolistic position that the Congress had hitherto enjoyed in imposing and enforcing hartals, strikes, etc. was being challenged. However, the League went ahead with the declaration, and Muslim newspapers published the programme for the day.

The Star of India, an influential local Muslim newspaper, edited by Raghib Ahsan Muslim League MLA from Calcutta published detailed programme for the day. The programme called for complete hartal and general strike in all spheres of civic, commercial and industrial life except essential services. The notice proclaimed that processions would start from multiple parts of Calcutta, Howrah, Hooghly, Metiabruz and 24 Parganas, and would converge at the foot of the Ochterlony Monument (now known as Shaheed Minar) where a joint mass rally presided over by Huseyn Shaheed Suhrawardy would be held. The Muslim League branches were advised to depute three workers in every mosque in every ward to explain the League's action plan before Juma prayers. Moreover, special prayers were arranged in every mosque on Friday after Juma prayers for the freedom of Muslim India. The notice drew divine inspiration from the Quran, emphasizing on the coincidence of Direct Action Day with the holy month of Ramzaan, claiming that the upcoming protests were an allegory of Prophet Muhammad's conflict with heathenism and subsequent conquest of Mecca and establishment of the kingdom of Heaven in Arabia.

Hindu public opinion was mobilized around the Akhand Hindusthan (United India) slogan. Certain Congress leaders in Bengal imbibed a strong sense of Hindu identity, especially in view of the perceived threat from the possibility of marginalizing themselves into minority against the onslaught of the Pakistan movement. Such mobilization along communal lines was partly successful due to a concerted propaganda campaign which resulted in a 'legitimization of communal solidarities'.

On the other hand, following the protests against the British after INA trials, the British administration decided to give more importance to protests against the government, rather than management of communal violence within the Indian populace, according to their "Emergency Action Scheme". Frederick Burrows, the Governor of Bengal, rationalized the declaration of "public holiday" in his report to Lord Wavell —
Suhrawardy put forth a great deal of effort to bring reluctant British officials around to calling the army in from Sealdah Rest Camp. Unfortunately, British officials did not send the army out until 1.45 am on 17 August.

Riots and massacre

Troubles started on the morning of 16 August. Even before 10 o'clock Police Headquarters at Lalbazar had reported that there was excitement throughout the city, that shops were being forced to close, and that there were many reports of brawls, stabbing and throwing of stones and brickbats. These were mainly concentrated in the North-central parts of the city like Rajabazar, Kelabagan, College Street, Harrison Road, Colootolla and Burrazar. Several of these areas had also been rocked by communal riots in December 1910. In these areas the Hindus were in a majority and were also in a superior and powerful economic position. The trouble had assumed the communal character which it was to retain throughout. The League's rally began at Ochterlony Monument at noon exactly. The gathering was considered as the 'largest ever Muslim assembly in Bengal' at that time.

The meeting began around 2 pm though processions of Muslims from all parts of Calcutta had started assembling since the midday prayers. A large number of the participants were reported to have been armed with iron bars and lathis (bamboo sticks). The numbers attending were estimated by a Central Intelligence Officer's reporter at 30,000 and by a Special Branch Inspector of Calcutta Police at 500,000. The latter figure is impossibly high and the Star of India reporter put it at about 100,000. The main speakers were Khawaja Nazimuddin and Chief Minister Huseyn Shaheed Suhrawardy. Khwaja Nazimuddin in his speech preached peacefulness and restraint but spoilt the effect and flared up the tensions by stating that till 11 o'clock that morning all the injured persons were Muslims, and the Muslim community had only retaliated in self-defence.

The Special Branch of Calcutta Police had sent only one shorthand reporter to the meeting, with the result that no transcript of the Chief Minister's speech is available. But the Central Intelligence Officer and a reporter, who Frederick Burrows believed was reliable, deputed by the military authorities agree on one statement (not reported at all by the Calcutta Police). The version in the former's report was—"He [the Chief Minister] had seen to police and military arrangements who would not interfere". The version of the latter's was—"He had been able to restrain the military and the police". However, the police did not receive any specific order to "hold back". So, whatever Suhrawardy may have meant to convey by this, the impression of such a statement on a largely uneducated audience is construed by some to be an open invitation to disorder indeed, many of the listeners are reported to have started attacking Hindus and looting Hindu shops as soon as they left the meeting. Subsequently, there were reports of lorries (trucks) that came down Harrison Road in Calcutta, carrying hardline Muslim gangsters armed with brickbats and bottles as weapons and attacking Hindu-owned shops.

A 6 pm curfew was imposed in the parts of the city where there had been rioting. At 8 pm forces were deployed to secure main routes and conduct patrols from those arteries, thereby freeing up police for work in the slums and the other underdeveloped sections.

On 17 August, Syed Abdullah Farooqui, the President of Garden Reach Textile Workers' Union, along with Elian Mistry, a hardline Muslim hooligan, led a huge armed mob into the mill compound of Kesoram Cotton Mills in the Lichubagan area of Metiabruz . The mill workers, among whom were a substantial number of Odias, used to stay in the mill compound itself. On 25 August, four survivors lodged a complaint at the Metiabruz police station against Farooqui. Bishwanath Das, a Minister in the Government of Orissa, visited Lichubagan to investigate into the killings of the Oriya labourers of Kesoram Cotton Mills. Some sources estimate that the death toll was 10,000 or more. Many authors claim that Hindus were the primary victims.

The worst of the killing took place during the day on 17 August. By late afternoon, soldiers brought the worst areas under control and the military expanded its hold overnight. In the slums and other areas, however, which were still outside military control, lawlessness and rioting escalated hourly. In the morning of 18 August, "Buses and taxis were charging about loaded with Sikhs and Hindus armed with swords, iron bars and firearms."

Skirmishes between the communities continued for almost a week. Finally, on 21 August, Bengal was put under Viceroy's rule. 5 battalions of British troops, supported by 4 battalions of Indians and Gurkhas, were deployed in the city. Lord Wavell alleged that more troops ought to have been called in earlier, and there is no indication that more British troops were not available. The rioting reduced on 22 August.

Characteristics of the riot and demographics in 1946
Suhrawardy put forth a great deal of effort to bring reluctant British officials around to calling the army in from Sealdah Rest Camp. Unfortunately, British officials did not send the army out until 1.45 am on 17 August.

Violence in Calcutta, between 1945 and 1946, passed by stages from Indian versus European to Hindu versus Muslim. Indian Christians and Europeans were generally free from molestation as the tempo of Hindu-Muslim violence quickened. The decline of anti-European feelings as communal Hindu-Muslim tensions increased during this period is evident from the casualty numbers. During the riots of November 1945, casualty of Europeans and Christians were 46; in the riots of the 10–14 February 1946, 35; from 15 February to 15 August, only 3; during the Calcutta riots from 15 August 1946 to 17 September 1946, none.

Kolkata had a Hindu population of 2,952,142, Muslim population of 1,099,562, Sikh  population of 12,852 as per 1946 year before partition and after independence Muslims population came down to just 601,817 due to the migration of 500,000 Muslims from Kolkata to East Pakistan after the riot. The 1951 Census of India recorded that 27% of Kolkata's population was East  Bengali refugees mainly Hindu Bengalis and they contributed the economic growth of Kolkata in various fields just after settlement. Millions of Bengali Hindus from East Pakistan had taken refuge mainly in the city and a number of estimations shows that around 320,000 Hindus from East Pakistan had immigrated to Kolkata alone during 1946–1950 period. The first census after partition shows that in Kolkata from 1941 to 1951 the number of Hindus increased while the number of Muslims decreased, that is Hindu percentage have increased from 73% in 1941 to 84% in 1951, while Muslim percentage have declined from 23% in 1941 to 12% in 1951 census. According to 2011 census, Kolkata city have a Hindu majority of (76.51%), Muslims stand at (20.6%) as 2nd largest community, and Sikh population stands at (0.31%).

Aftermath
During the riots, thousands began fleeing Calcutta. For several days the Howrah Bridge over the Hooghly River was crowded with evacuees headed for the Howrah station to escape the mayhem in Calcutta. Many of them would not escape the violence that spread out into the region outside Calcutta. Lord Wavell claimed during his meeting on 27 August 1946 that Mahatma Gandhi had told him, "If India wants bloodbath she shall have it ... if a bloodbath was necessary, it would come about in spite of non-violence".

There was criticism of Suhrawardy, Chief Minister in charge of the Home Portfolio in Calcutta, for being partisan and of Sir Frederick John Burrows, the British Governor of Bengal, for not having taken control of the situation. The Chief Minister spent a great deal of time in the Control Room in the Police Headquarters at Lalbazar, often attended by some of his supporters. Short of a direct order from the Governor, there was no way of preventing the Chief Minister from visiting the Control Room whenever he liked; and Governor Burrows was not prepared to give such an order, as it would clearly have indicated complete lack of faith in him.

Prominent Muslim League leaders spent a great deal of time in police control rooms directing operations and the role of Suhrawardy in obstructing police duties is documented.

Both the British and Congress blamed Jinnah for calling the Direct Action Day and the Muslim League was seen responsible for stirring up the Muslim nationalist sentiment.

There are several views on the exact cause of the Direct Action Day riots. The Hindu press blamed the Suhrawardy Government and the Muslim League. According to the authorities, riots were instigated by members of the Muslim League and its affiliate Volunteer Corps, in the city in order to enforce the declaration by the Muslim League that Muslims were to 'suspend all business' to support their demand for an independent Pakistan. However, supporters of the Muslim League believed that the Congress Party was behind the violence in an effort to weaken the fragile Muslim League government in Bengal. Historian Joya Chatterji allocates much of the responsibility to Suhrawardy, for setting up the confrontation and failing to stop the rioting, but points out that Hindu leaders were also culpable. Members of the Indian National Congress, including Mohandas Gandhi and Jawaharlal Nehru responded negatively to the riots and expressed shock. The riots would lead to further rioting and pogroms between Hindus and Sikhs and Muslims.

Further rioting in India
The Direct Action Day riots sparked off several riots between Muslims and Hindus/Sikhs in Noakhali, Bihar, and Punjab in that year.

Noakhali riots

An important sequel to Direct Action Day was the massacre in Noakhali and Tippera districts in October 1946. News of the Great Calcutta Riot touched off the Noakhali–Tippera riot in reaction. However, the violence was different in nature from Calcutta.

Rioting in the districts began on 10 October 1946 in the area of northern Noakhali district under Ramganj police station. The violence unleashed was described as "the organized fury of the Muslim mob". It soon engulfed the neighbouring police stations of Raipur, Lakshmipur, Begumganj and Sandip in Noakhali, and Faridganj, Hajiganj, Chandpur, Laksham and Chudagram in Tippera. The disruption caused by the widespread violence was extensive, making it difficult to accurately establish the number of casualties. Official estimates put the number of dead between 200 and 300. After the riots were stopped in Noakhali, the Muslim League claimed that only 500 Hindus were killed in the mayhem, but the survivors opined that more than 50,000 Hindus were killed. According to Francis Tuker, who at the time of the disturbances was General Officer Commanding-in-Chief, Eastern Command, India, the Hindu press intentionally and grossly exaggerated reports of disorder. The neutral and widely accepted death toll figure is around 5000.

According to Governor Burrows, "the immediate occasion for the outbreak of the disturbances was the looting of a Bazar [market] in Ramganj police station following the holding of a mass meeting." This included attacks on the place of business of Surendra Nath Bose and Rajendra Lal Roy Choudhury, the erstwhile president of the Noakhali Bar and a prominent Hindu Mahasabha leader.

Mahatma Gandhi camped in Noakhali for four months and toured the district in a mission to restore peace and communal harmony. In the meantime, the Congress leadership started to accept the proposed Partition of India and the peace mission and other relief camps were abandoned. The majority of the survivors migrated to West Bengal, Tripura and Assam.

Bihar and rest of India
A devastating riot rocked Bihar towards the end of 1946. Between 30 October and 7 November, a large-scale massacre in Bihar brought Partition closer to inevitability. Severe violence broke out in Chhapra and Saran district, between 25 and 28 October. Very soon Patna, Munger and Bhagalpur also became the sites of serious violence. Begun as a reprisal for the Noakhali riot, whose death toll had been greatly overstated in immediate reports, it was difficult for authorities to deal with because it was spread out over a large area of scattered villages, and the number of casualties was impossible to establish accurately: "According to a subsequent statement in the British Parliament, the death-toll amounted to 5,000. The Statesman's estimate was between 7,500 and 10,000; the Congress party admitted to 2,000; Jinnah claimed about 30,000." However, By 3 November, the official estimate put the figure of death at only 445.

According to some independent sources, the death toll was around 8,000 human lives.

Some of the worst rioting also took place in Garhmukteshwar in United Provinces where a massacre occurred in November 1946, in which "Hindu pilgrims, at the annual religious fair, set upon and exterminated Muslims, not only on the festival grounds but in the adjacent town" while the police did little or nothing; the deaths were estimated at between 1,000 and 2,000.
Rioting also took place in Punjab and Northwest Frontier Province in late 1946 and early 1947.

See also 
Opposition to the partition of India

References

Bibliography

 
 
 
 
 

 

1946 protests
20th-century mass murder in India
Bengal Presidency
Pakistan Movement
Riots and civil disorder in India
Attacks on religious buildings and structures in India
Ethnic cleansing in Asia
Partition of India
Religious riots
Religiously motivated violence in India
Sexual violence at riots and crowd disturbances
20th century in Kolkata
Mass murder in 1946
Massacres in India
Massacres in 1946
Muslim League
1946 riots
1946 in British India
Pogroms
Persecution of Hindus
Persecution by Hindus
Persecution by Muslims
Persecution of Muslims
Political terminology in Pakistan
Massacres of Bengali Hindus in British India
August 1946 events in Asia
1946 murders in India